Meet the Boyfriend is a 1937 American film directed by Ralph Staub.

Plot summary 
A heartthrob singer, Tony Page, also known as "America's Boyfriend", decides to wed a Swedish actress. His manager doesn't want this because he is afraid of Tony losing female fans, so he takes up a $300,000 insurance policy if Tony does in fact wed. Tony soon meets a girl named June Delaney on a bus who doesn't swoon over him like other girls. He falls for her but doesn't know her true identity.

Cast 
Robert Paige as Tony Page
Carol Hughes as June Delaney
Warren Hymer as Wilbur 'Bugs' Corrigan
Pert Kelton as Beulah Potts
Andrew Tombes as J. Ardmore Potts
Gwili Andre as Vilma Vlare
Ed 'Oscar' Platt as Oscar
Lou Fulton as Elmer
Smiley Burnette as Orchestra Leader
Leonid Kinskey as Dr. Sokoloff
Syd Saylor as Buddy
Selmer Jackson as Madison
Cy Kendall as Walters
Robert Middlemass as McGrath
Mary Gordon as Mrs. Grimes

Soundtrack 
 "Sweet Lips (Kiss My Blues Away)" (Written by Harry Tobias and Roy Ingraham)
 "You Are My Rosebud" (Music by Alberto Colombo / Lyrics by Smiley Burnette)
 "Singing My Hillbilly Song" (Written by Smiley Burnette) 
 "To Know You Care" (Written by Harry Tobias and Roy Ingraham)
 "This Business of Love" (Written by Harry Tobias and Roy Ingraham)

External links 

1937 romantic comedy films
1937 films
American black-and-white films
American romantic comedy films
Republic Pictures films
Films directed by Ralph Staub
1930s English-language films
1930s American films